Sheridan Township is a civil township of Mason County in the U.S. state of Michigan. As of the 2010 census, the township population was 1,072.

History
Sheridan Township was established in 1889. It was named for Philip Sheridan, a Union Army general.

Geography

Demographics
As of the census of 2000, there were 969 people, 409 households, and 280 families residing in the township. The racial makeup of the township was 97.11% White, 0.21% African American, 0.52% Native American, 0.10% Asian, 0.52% from other races, and 1.55% from two or more races. Hispanic or Latino of any race were 1.44% of the population.

There were 409 households, out of which 20.0% had children under the age of 18 living with them, 57.7% were married couples living together, 6.8% had a female householder with no husband present, and 31.5% were non-families. 25.9% of all households were made up of individuals, and 9.3% had someone living alone who was 65 years of age or older.  The average household size was 2.33 and the average family size was 2.80.

In the township the population was spread out, with 19.9% under the age of 18, 5.9% from 18 to 24, 25.6% from 25 to 44, 31.5% from 45 to 64, and 17.1% who were 65 years of age or older.  The median age was 44 years. For every 100 females, there were 100.2 males.  For every 100 females age 18 and over, there were 102.6 males.

The median income for a household in the township was $30,357, and the median income for a family was $35,000. Males had a median income of $34,167 versus $22,917 for females. The per capita income for the township was $17,679.  About 10.2% of families and 15.3% of the population were below the poverty line, including 29.6% of those under age 18 and 8.2% of those age 65 or over.

References

Townships in Mason County, Michigan
Townships in Michigan
Populated places established in 1889
1889 establishments in Michigan